Ramona is a city in Marion County, Kansas, United States.  As of the 2020 census, the population of the city was 78.  It is located southwest of Herington next to a railroad.

History

Early history

For many millennia, the Great Plains of North America was inhabited by nomadic Native Americans.  From the 16th century to 18th century, the Kingdom of France claimed ownership of large parts of North America.  In 1762, after the French and Indian War, France secretly ceded New France to Spain, per the Treaty of Fontainebleau.

19th century
In 1802, Spain returned most of the land to France.  In 1803, most of the land for modern day Kansas was acquired by the United States from France as part of the 828,000 square mile Louisiana Purchase for 2.83 cents per acre.

In 1854, the Kansas Territory was organized, then in 1861 Kansas became the 34th U.S. state.  In 1855, Marion County was established within the Kansas Territory, which included the land for modern day Ramona.

The city name Ramona is a Spanish name.  Land ownership of the Ramona area dates back when the area belonged to Spain.  Manuel De Lisa, a New Orleans merchant, petitioned his government for a large land grant in the Ramona area on July 16, 1799.

In 1887, the Chicago, Kansas and Nebraska Railway built a main line from Herington through Ramona to Pratt.  In 1888, this line was extended to Liberal.  Later, it was extended to Tucumcari, New Mexico and El Paso, Texas.  It foreclosed in 1891 and taken over by Chicago, Rock Island and Pacific Railway, which shut down in 1980 and reorganized as Oklahoma, Kansas and Texas Railroad, merged in 1988 with Missouri Pacific Railroad, and finally merged in 1997 with Union Pacific Railroad.  Most locals still refer to this railroad as the "Rock Island".

A post office was established in Ramona on August 9, 1887.

21st century
In 2010, the Keystone-Cushing Pipeline (Phase II) was constructed near Ramona, north to south through Marion County, with much controversy over road damage, tax exemption, and environmental concerns (if a leak ever occurs).

Geography
Ramona is located at coordinates 38.5972316, -97.0619627 in the scenic Flint Hills and Great Plains of the state of Kansas. The county line is 0.5 miles north of Ramona.

Area events
 July 4th Celebration, the event is named "RedNeck in Ramona".

Demographics

2010 census
As of the census of 2010, there were 187 people, 66 households, and 45 families residing in the city. The racial makeup of the city was 93.0% White, 2.1% Native American, and 4.8% from two or more races. Hispanic or Latino of any race were 1.6% of the population.

There were 66 households, of which 36.4% had children under the age of 18 living with them, 47.0% were married couples living together, 9.1% had a female householder with no husband present, 12.1% had a male householder with no wife present, and 31.8% were non-families. 19.7% of all households were made up of individuals, and 7.5% had someone living alone who was 65 years of age or older. The average household size was 2.83 and the average family size was 3.36.

The median age in the city was 33.5 years. 35.3% of residents were under the age of 18; 2.2% were between the ages of 18 and 24; 21.9% were from 25 to 44; 27.8% were from 45 to 64; and 12.8% were 65 years of age or older. The gender makeup of the city was 54.5% male and 45.5% female.

2000 census
As of the census of 2000, there were 94 people, 40 households, and 27 families residing in the city. The racial makeup of the city was 95.74% White, 4.26% from other races. Hispanic or Latino of any race were 6.38% of the population.

There were 40 households, out of which 20.0% had children under the age of 18 living with them, 42.5% were married couples living together, 12.5% had a female householder with no husband present, and 32.5% were non-families. 25.0% of all households were made up of individuals, and 20.0% had someone living alone who was 65 years of age or older. The average household size was 2.35 and the average family size was 2.74.

In the city, the population was spread out, with 25.5% under the age of 18, 6.4% from 18 to 24, 24.5% from 25 to 44, 14.9% from 45 to 64, and 28.7% who were 65 years of age or older. The median age was 40 years. For every 100 females, there were 104.3 males. For every 100 females age 18 and over, there were 112.1 males.

As of 2000 the median income for a household in the city was $26,458, and the median income for a family was $33,125. Males had a median income of $28,750 versus $26,875 for females. The per capita income for the city was $17,345. None of the population and none of the families were below the poverty line.

Government
The Ramona government consists of a mayor and five council members.  The council meets the 2nd and last Monday of each month at 7PM.
 City Hall, 311 "D" Street.
 U.S. Post Office, 215 "D" Street.

Education
The community is served by Centre USD 397 public school district.  The high school is a member of T.E.E.N., a shared video teaching network between five area high schools.
 Centre School; 2374 310th St, Lost Springs, KS; between Lost Springs and Lincolnville, east of U.S. 77 highway.

Media

Print
 The Herington Times, newspaper from Herington.
 Marion County Record, newspaper from Marion.
 Hillsboro Free Press, free newspaper for greater Marion County area.

Infrastructure

Transportation
Ramona is served by the Union Pacific Railroad, formerly the Southern Pacific, and prior, the Chicago, Rock Island and Pacific Railroad. Ramona is located on UP's Golden State main line to El Paso, Texas, and has a rail siding for train meets before entering UP's Herington, Kansas Yard. The line was originally built by the Chicago, Kansas and Nebraska Railroad.

Utilities
 Internet
 Fiber Optics is provided by TCT.
 Satellite is provided by HughesNet, StarBand, WildBlue.
 TV
 Fiber Optics is provided by TCT.
 Satellite is provided by DirecTV, Dish Network.
 Terrestrial is provided by regional digital TV stations.
 Telephone
 Fiber Optics is provided by TCT.
 Electricity
 City is provided by Westar Energy.
 Rural is provided by Flint Hills RECA.
 Natural Gas is provided by Atmos Energy.
 Water
 City is provided by Marion County RWD #1, billed by City of Ramona.
 Rural is provided by Marion County RWD #1.
 Sewer
 Service is provided by City of Ramona.
 Trash
 Service is provided by M&K Trash.

Notable people
 Glenn S. Strickler, (1901–1979), Kansas House of Representatives, Merchant

See also
 Historical Maps of Marion County, Kansas
 Centre High School

References

Further reading

 A Century of Memories: The Ramona Story, Early History and Settlement, 1887-1987; Ramona Centennial Committee; 98 pages; 1987.

External links

City
 Ramona - Directory of Public Officials, League of Kansas Municipalities
Historical
 History of Ramona
 Ramona History
 Historic Images of Ramona, Special Photo Collections at Wichita State University Library.
 Marion County cemetery list, archive of KsGenWeb
 Marion County history bibliography,  Marion County school bibliography, Kansas Historical Society
Maps
 Ramona city map, KDOT
 Topo Map of Ramona area, USGS

Cities in Kansas
Cities in Marion County, Kansas
Populated places established in 1887